The following is a list of characters that have appeared in the television series Beware the Batman.

Main characters
 Bruce Wayne / Batman (voiced by Anthony Ruivivar) – The title character of the series. Mitch Watson, co-producer of Beware the Batman, explained how the crew behind the series approached Batman for the show the way they did, stating "In the way we approached Batman for this show, he's at the beginning of his career, he's probably been doing it for about five to six years, he's in his early 30s. And character-wise, we broke him into three parts. There's the public Bruce Wayne, who we modeled slightly after Richard Branson. We wanted to make Bruce Wayne more of an altruistic guy and the company's (Wayne Enterprise) trying to do good. So, that's the public Bruce. The private Bruce is more introspective guy who really only deals with Alfred, and Alfred at the beginning of the series is really the only person who sees that side of Bruce Wayne. He's quiet; he's a little bit obsessive about particular things." Developers expressed that the series would be a departure from previous Batman animated series in their choice to focus on the character's nature as a detective and focusing on his intellect. Crime fighting in the series would put emphasis on procedural aspects of mystery solving. Batman would also be more subject to external threats of injury. "He gets hurt. There are several episodes where he really gets damaged", emphasized Mitch Watson.

 Alfred Pennyworth (voiced by JB Blanc) – Alfred Pennyworth is a former MI6 agent and Bruce Wayne's butler. Following initial promotion of the series, critics were concerned with what they interpreted to be the re-characterization of Alfred Pennyworth as a fellow crime fighter. Producer Glen Murakami explained that initial promotion posters that had been issued to the press were not originally intended for release, and that they did not give an accurate display of Alfred's role in the show. However, Murakami referred to Alfred's canonical backstory, which cast Alfred as a former MI6 agent, and said that this would be Alfred's portrayal in the show. "I think people are really going to like him", series writer Mitch Watson said. "He's Sean Connery from The Untouchables. The characterization of Alfred would be that of a man who was once in a physical condition on par with Batman, who was now in his 60s and past his prime, but still able to provide advice to Batman and be an ally when necessary. This characterization was pitched to DC comics, who responded that the company was coincidentally also taking Alfred in that direction. Series developers originally intended to give Alfred a greater role in the series, but Murakami advised that they scale back his activities, over concern that he could outshine Batman.

 Tatsu Yamashiro / Katana (voiced by Sumalee Montano) – A martial arts swordmaster in hiding from the League of Assassins who was hired to act as Bruce Wayne's bodyguard by her godfather Alfred Pennyworth. She revealed to Alfred that she was undercover in the League of Assassins to steal the Soultaker Sword from them before it can be used for their own evils.

 Commissioner Jim Gordon (voiced by Kurtwood Smith) – A police lieutenant who works at the Gotham City Police Department. Although he disapproved of Batman's crime-fighting, he slowly became an ally of Batman. He is later promoted to police commissioner during the second half of the first season after Commissioner Correa was killed by two League of Assassins ninjas.

Villains
When the series was first unveiled, it was announced that lesser known villains would be introduced. Sam Register explained "We went in deeper into the villain library and pulled out some other villains" and the studio did not want the series to do another "Joker story". The following villains are listed in order of appearance:
 Lazlo Valentin / Professor Pyg (voiced by Brian George) – Professor Pyg is an eco-terrorist, thematically inspired by The Wind in the Willows. Some of Professor Pyg's eco-terrorism ranges from targeting businesspeople who did shady deals involving land developing on a swamp, capturing models and fashion designers that use parts of different animals (like bird feathers and animal pelts), and creating mutated animals.
 Mister Toad (voiced by Udo Kier) – Professor Pyg's henchman. In this show, Mister Toad fights with a wooden cane that conceals a flamethrower and he has a sonic croak and prehensile tongue.

 Margaret Sorrow / Magpie (voiced by Grey DeLisle-Griffin) – Magpie, a character created in the 1980s, underwent a massive redesign to give her a more contemporary appearance. She can grow poisonous claws for nails and is unable to feel pain after an experiment to that would purge Margaret Sorrow's kleptomaniac tendencies in return for a reduced sentence at Blackgate Penitentiary. However, her memories altered with the new identity of "Cassie", Margaret's darker aspects manifested as a second personality called Magpie. Magpie also harbors a romantic obsession with Batman; which the hero does not reciprocate.

 Anarky (voiced by Wallace Langham) – A mysterious figure who self-identifies as a madman and champion of chaos in opposition to Batman, who he sees as the champion of law and order. Whereas the original character is an anti-villain thematically based on socio-political philosophy, producers announced that Anarky was chosen to function as the main villain, and was re-characterized as a criminal mastermind who would challenge Batman through complex schemes and machinations. In the closing credits of "Tests", the creation credits for Anarky and Katana were swapped, thus erroneously crediting Mike W. Barr and Jim Aparo for creating him.

 Tucker Long / Junkyard Dog (voiced by Carlos Alazraqui) – Junkyard, along with his friend and fellow artist Doodlebug, were detained by Batman but were freed by Anarky and recruited by him to sow chaos and destruction. Though Anarky supplied them with progressively destructive equipment, the two were eventually defeated and arrested once again.

 Daedalus Boch / Doodlebug (voiced by Arif S. Kinchen) – Doodlebug, along with his friend and fellow artist Junkyard Dog, were caught and handcuffed by Batman but were freed by Anarky and recruited by him to sow chaos and destruction. Though Anarky supplied them with progressively destructive equipment, the two were eventually defeated and arrested once again.

 League of Assassins – A secret international criminal organization consisting of highly trained warriors. Katana once infiltrated their ranks in order to steal the Soultaker Sword from them. The plots of the League of Assassins have included reclaiming the Soultaker Sword from Katana and plotted to take control of the Ion Cortex.
 Ra's al Ghul (voiced by Lance Reddick) – Leader of the League of Assassins. His body was first revealed to be in suspended animation. He was revived from suspended animation by Lady Shiva.
 Sandra Wu-San / Lady Shiva (voiced by Finola Hughes) – An elite member of the League of Assassins.
 Silver Monkey (voiced by James Remar) – An elite agent of the League of Assassins that wears a silver monkey mask. He tried to take the Soultaker Sword for himself until Lady Shiva caught on to his plan.
 Avery Twombey / Cypher – A half-human half-computer agent of the League of Assassins.

 Tobias Whale (voiced by Michael-Leon Wooley) – Tobias Whale is an African American albino crime boss.
 Milo Match / Phosphorus Rex (voiced by Greg Ellis) – Milo Match is Tobias Whale's lawyer. As Phosphorus Rex, he is Tobias Whale's chief enforcer who can perform fire attacks. The original comic book counterpart to this character is a member of the Circus of Strange (the same criminal organization that Professor Pyg and Mister Toad are members of) and his real name was unrevealed.

 The Ghosts – A small-time criminal group that resides in a part of Gotham City called the Cauldron (which used to be a thriving industrial park).

 Humphry Dumpler / Humpty Dumpty (voiced by Matt L. Jones) – Humphry Dumpler is a former mob accountant who developed a childlike personality due to a missile blasted at him and or Commissioner Gordon presumably from Tobias Whale. He is obsessed with the nursery rhyme where he committed crimes using toy soldiers with real weapons built on to them.

 The Key (voiced by JB Blanc) – A criminal who can mold his fingers into any key to fit the locks and is able to download digital security keys from computers into his brain.

 Killer Croc (voiced by Wade Williams) – Killer Croc is a crocodile-like criminal that is known as the "King of Blackgate Prison". Following his fight with Batman, Killer Croc moved his criminal activity to the sewers.
 Matatoa (voiced by Michael-Leon Wooley) – A killer covered in tribal tattoos who wields two daggers and is allegedly immortal after eating his victims' hearts to absorb their life force. He fights Batman for Killer Croc when Batman allows himself to be imprisoned in Blackgate Penitentiary to rescue the Key from Killer Croc as the Key had downloaded important security codes that Killer Croc wanted.

 Slade Wilson / Deathstroke / Dane Lisslow / Bad Batman (voiced by Robin Atkin Downes) – Slade Wilson is an elite mercenary that is hired by Harvey Dent and Anarky to hunt down Batman.

 The Council – An organization that captured Paul Kirk.
 Dr. Anatol Mykros (voiced by Bruce Thomas) – The leader of The Council.

 Harvey Dent / Two-Face (voiced by Christopher McDonald) – A district attorney who is obsessed with bringing Batman down. He eventually gains his own assault squad and is shown to be very deceptive. Following an accident where his head is covered in bandages, Harvey Dent's bad side starts to surface where he becomes Two-Face.

Other characters
 Barbara Gordon / Oracle (voiced by Tara Strong) – The daughter of James Gordon who has a continuing interest in Batman, and later, Katana.

 Madison Randall (voiced by Sumalee Montano) – A female news anchor that works for Gotham News.

 Simon Stagg (voiced by Jeff Bennett) – A businessman who is the CEO of Stagg Enterprise. He is also responsible for turning Rex Mason into Metamorpho.

 Sapphire Stagg (voiced by Emmanuelle Chriqui) – Simon Stagg's daughter and co-owner of his business.

 Michael Holt (voiced by Gary Anthony Williams) – In this show, Michael Holt is a businessman who was hunted by Professor Pyg and Mister Toad.

 Dr. Bethanie Ravencroft (voiced by Cree Summer) – A psychologist who formerly experimented on rehabilitating criminals including Magpie. Bethanie has repeatedly tried to get Bruce Wayne to join the Argus Club. She was later revealed to be in league with Silver Monkey and ends up having her soul drained by Lady Shiva using the Soultaker Sword even though she claimed that she wasn't working against her.

 Lunkhead (voiced by JB Blanc) – The massive yet childlike thug with a distinctive lump on the top of his forehead and possess superhuman strength. He was interrogated by Lt. Gordon on the case of Magpie where it was revealed that Lunkhead was also part of the same experiment in Blackgate Prison involving mind control along with Magpie but was unsuccessful. He is seemingly killed by Magpie in "Attraction".

 Dr. Jason Burr (voiced by Matthew Lillard) – A scientist who worked on the Ion Cortex which was targeted by the League of Assassins.

 Officer O'Brien (voiced by Michael Patrick McGill) – A police officer who works at Gotham City Police Department under Lt. James Gordon.

 Rex Mason / Metamorpho (voiced by Adam Baldwin) – Rex Mason was a security guard for Stagg Enterprises who was caught having a relationship with Simon Stagg's daughter, Sapphire. Infuriated, Stagg lured him into a chamber of experimental Metamorpho project, which resulted in Mason acquiring shapeshifting and elemental powers.

 Marion Grange (voiced by C.C.H. Pounder) – The Mayor of Gotham City who first appears in "Nexus". Following the incident with Humpty Dumpty, Marion Grange resigns from office and David Hull is sworn in as the new Mayor of Gotham City.

 Dr. Kirk Langstrom / Man-Bat (voiced by Robin Atkin Downes) – Dr. Kirk Langstrom is a scientist who was working on bat DNA to find a cure for an unknown disease until Professor Pyg and Mister Toad had him use the bat DNA formula on himself which transformed him into Man-Bat.

 David Hull (voiced by James Patrick Stuart) – He first appeared as the deputy mayor for Marion Grange. After Grange steps down following the incident with Humpty Dumpty, David Hull is sworn in as the new Mayor of Gotham City.

 Paul Kirk / The Manhunter (voiced by Xander Berkeley) – Paul Kirk is a secret agent and a former hostage of The Council which used him to create a small army of non-organic Manhunter clones.

 Ava Kirk (voiced by Tisha Terrasini Banker) – A renowned doctor and daughter of Paul Kirk. Love interest for Bruce Wayne.

 Jocelyn Kilroy (voiced by Beth Tapper) - Head of Gotham's CDC department who tried to prevent an outbreak, even if it meant the death of Batman and Katana. She later runs for mayor before being intimidated by Two-Face and Anarky into quitting.

References

Lists of DC Nation television characters
Beware the Batman
Beware the Batman